Johnny Kemp is the self-titled debut studio album by American recording artist Johnny Kemp. The first hit from the album was the single "Just Another Lover". The album also includes the hits "Cover Girl", "Penthouse Lover", and "Can't Get Enough". This album was digitally remastered first by Blue Bird Records in 2007 and recently by Funky Town Grooves in 2013, including eight additional bonus tracks, mainly remixes and instrumental versions.

Track listing

References

External links
 
 Johnny Kemp at Discogs
 Facebook Page
 Myspace

1986 debut albums
Johnny Kemp albums
Columbia Records albums